Umar Bala Muhammed (born 7 March 1998) is a Nigerian footballer who plays for Falkenberg in Sweden.

References

External links

1998 births
Living people
Nigerian footballers
Association football defenders
Nigerian expatriate footballers
Expatriate footballers in Belarus
Expatriate footballers in Sweden
Nigerian expatriate sportspeople in Belarus
Nigerian expatriate sportspeople in Sweden
Kada City F.C. players
FC Slutsk players
Falkenbergs FF players
Superettan players